Point de Gaze (sometimes Point de Gauze) is a needle lace from Belgium named for the gauze-like appearance of the mesh ground. It was made from the early to mid 1800s to sometime bertween 1914 and the 1930s.

Etymology
The word lace is from Middle English, from Old French las, noose, string, from Vulgar Latin *laceum, from Latin laqueus, noose; probably akin to lacere, to entice, ensnare. This type of lace takes its name from the fact that its ground mesh is very loose.At one time, the French names of bobbin and needle laces were preceded by the word "point."

Characteristics 
Point de Gaze is made of open, twisted buttonhole stitches of very fine thread. The buttonholes connect through each other, yielding a light, gauze-like ground fabric. This type of lace uses floral designs, with both garden and wild flowers evident. Also found are ferns and leaves. These floral designs frequently included borders, scrolls, and other non-floral elements. Either cotton or linen thread can be used to make it. It was used to make clothing (dresses, shawls, and flounces) as well as accessories, such as handkerchiefs, parasols, and fans.

Origins and history
Point de Gaze is a type of needlepoint lace that originated in the area of Brussels, Belgium. It was constructed from the middle of the 19th century until approximately the start of World War I in 1914  or until the  1930s. One source indicates that its manufacture started earlier, in the 1830s.

The Schiffli machine, which used net to mimic the gauze-like texture, was able to imitate the production of hand-made Point de Gaze lace.

References

Needle lace
Textile arts of Belgium